Mohammad Nazmul Islam (born 21 March 1991), also known as Nazmul Apu is a Bangladeshi first-class, List A and Twenty20 cricketer and former international cricketer. Nazmul is a left-handed batsman and a left-arm orthodox spin bowler.

Domestic career
Nazmul has played for Dhaka Division in the National Cricket League (NCL). He has represented his country playing for Bangladesh A and at under-23 level. In the Bangladesh Cricket League (BCL), he has played for both East Zone and South Zone.

In October 2018, Nazmul was named in the squad for the Rangpur Riders team, following the draft for the 2018–19 Bangladesh Premier League. In November 2019, he was selected to play for the Sylhet Thunder in the 2019–20 Bangladesh Premier League. In November 2021, he was selected to play for the Kandy Warriors following the players' draft for the 2021 Lanka Premier League.

International career
In February 2018, Nazmul was added to Bangladesh's Twenty20 International (T20I) squad for their series against Sri Lanka. He made his T20I debut for Bangladesh against Sri Lanka on 15 February 2018.

In August 2018, Nazmul was one of twelve debutants to be selected for a 31-man preliminary squad for Bangladesh ahead of the 2018 Asia Cup. Later that month, he was named in Bangladesh's fifteen-man squad for the tournament. He made his One Day International (ODI) debut for Bangladesh against Afghanistan on 23 September 2018.

In October 2018, Nazmul was named in Bangladesh's Test squad for their series against Zimbabwe. He made his Test debut for Bangladesh against Zimbabwe on 3 November 2018.

Personal life

Covid-19
On 20 June 2020, Nazmul was reportedly tested positive for COVID-19 alongside fellow Bangladeshi cricketers Mashrafe Mortaza and Nafees Iqbal.

References

External links
 

1991 births
Bangladeshi cricketers
Bangladesh Test cricketers
Bangladesh One Day International cricketers
Bangladesh Twenty20 International cricketers
Abahani Limited cricketers
Bangladesh A cricketers
Bangladesh under-23 cricketers
Fortune Barishal cricketers
Chittagong Division cricketers
Dhaka Division cricketers
East Zone cricketers
Kala Bagan Cricket Academy cricketers
Prime Bank Cricket Club cricketers
South Zone cricketers
Sylhet Strikers cricketers
Living people
Rajshahi Royals cricketers
Rangpur Riders cricketers
Cricketers from Dhaka
South Asian Games gold medalists for Bangladesh
South Asian Games medalists in cricket